Colstrip is a city in Rosebud County, Montana, United States. The population was 2,096 at the 2020 census.  Established in 1924 and incorporated as a city in 1998, Colstrip is the largest city in Rosebud County with 25.2%  of the total population.  Colstrip's primary industries are coal mining and electricity production. In 2005,  Sports Illustrated’s 50th anniversary issue named Colstrip the top sports town in Montana. 
The entire community celebrates Colstrip Days annually on the weekend prior to the 4th of July.

History 

Colstrip was established by the Northern Pacific Railway in 1924 as a company town to provide coal for their steam locomotives.  The mining at Rosebud Mine two miles south of the town is open pit strip mining, where draglines remove soil above the layer of bituminous coal from the Fort Union Formation.

During The Second World War, the Colstrip mine was identified as strategically important because it supplied coal for the Northern Pacific Railway steam locomotives hauling military equipment for the war effort. The mine was guarded from sabotage, and the employees were not allowed to quit their jobs.

In 1958, the railroad switched to using diesel locomotives and the Colstrip mine was shut down. In 1959, Montana Power Company purchased the rights to the mine and the town, and resumed mining operations in the 1970s with plans to build coal-fired electrical plants.

The power plants were built in the 1970s and 1980s by a collection of contractors including Bechtel. During this construction period, Colstrip was a boomtown, with a large increase in population. Plants 1 and 2 became operational in 1975 and 1976, and plants 3 and 4 became operational in 1984 and 1986.

In 1974, construction of Colstrip's  Castle Rock Lake (formerly named surge pond) was completed. The Colstrip plants produce electricity from coal using steam.  The water for the steam is pumped in an underground pipe  from the Yellowstone River and stored in the lake. The lake is stocked with fish and the home for a wide variety of wildlife.

In 1990, the Colstrip Energy Limited Project started commercial operations.  Located six miles (10 km) north of Colstrip, this experimental electricity production facility is owned by Rosebud Energy Corp., a partnership that at one point included Enron. The plant uses high sulfur waste coal from the Rosebud Coal Mine's topmost one foot layer of coal.

In 1998, plants 1-4 were sold to a group led by PPL Corporation (PPL)
 
and  Puget Sound Energy
(PSE).  The Rosebud Coal Mine was sold to Westmoreland Mining LLC.

 
In this same year, the City of Colstrip was incorporated.

In June 2015, PPL spun off its power generation assets including the Colstrip plants to become Talen Energy.

In 2016, Puget Sound Energy reached an agreement with the Sierra Club and the Montana Environmental Information Center to shut down units 1 and 2 of the coal-fired generating plant by the year 2022. The agreement said nothing about the status of Units 3 and 4 at the generating station. However, the existing electrical transmission capacity that transmits power from Colstrip to the Pacific Northwest may be used to transmit wind energy.

In June 2019, Talen Energy announced the closure of two of the four coal burning units by the end of the year. The power plant is "the sixth-largest source of greenhouse emissions in the U.S." Units 3 and 4 will remain in operation.

In January 2020, Puget Sound Energy announced that Unit 1 ceased operating in the "first days of January", and Unit 2 ceased operating on January 4. Units 3 and 4 will remain operational as planned, but will be closed within the next five years.

Colstrip is the proposed junction point of the BNSF Railway's trackage through the city with the proposed Tongue River Railroad south to new coal mines near the Wyoming border.

Geography

Climate
According to the Köppen Climate Classification system, Colstrip has a semi-arid climate, abbreviated "BSk" on climate maps.

Demographics

The historical population of Colstrip has varied largely since it was established in 1924.  Prior to incorporation in 1998 it was a census-designated place.

2010 census
As of the census of 2010, there were 2,214 people, 863 households, and 622 families residing in the city. The racial makeup of the city was 84.7% White, 0.2% African American, 9.0% Native American, 0.6% Asian, 0.1% Pacific Islander, 0.4% from other races, and 5.0% from two or more races. Hispanic or Latino of any race were 4.3% of the population.

There were 863 households, of which 35.9% had children under the age of 18 living with them, 61.8% were married couples living together, 5.8% had a female householder with no husband present, 4.5% had a male householder with no wife present, and 27.9% were non-families. 24.1% of all households were made up of individuals, and 5.2% had someone living alone who was 65 years of age or older. The average household size was 2.57 and the average family size was 3.06.

The median age in the city was 38.1 years. 28.2% of residents were under the age of 18; 5.9% were between the ages of 18 and 24; 24.9% were from 25 to 44; 36% were from 45 to 64; and 5.2% were 65 years of age or older. The gender makeup of the city was 51.8% male and 48.2% female.

2000 census
As of the census of 2000, there were 2,346 people, 825 households, and 674 families residing in the city. The population density was 522.6 people per square mile (201.7/km2). There were 936 housing units at an average density of 208.5 per square mile (80.5/km2). The racial makeup of the city was 83.93% White, 0.68% African American, 11.30% Native American, 0.13% Asian, 0.51% from other races, and 3.45% from two or more races. Hispanic or Latino of any race were 3.15% of the population.

There were 825 households, out of which 48.2% had children under the age of 18 living with them, 66.8% were married couples living together, 9.6% had a female householder with no husband present, and 18.3% were non-families. 16.7% of all households were made up of individuals, and 2.5% had someone living alone who was 65 years of age or older. The average household size was 2.84 and the average family size was 3.18.

In the city, the population was spread out, with 34.4% under the age of 18, 6.1% from 18 to 24, 28.7% from 25 to 44, 27.7% from 45 to 64, and 3.1% who were 65 years of age or older. The median age was 35 years. For every 100 females, there were 106.0 males. For every 100 females age 18 and over, there were 100.9 males.

The median income for a household in the city was $55,650, and the median income for a family was $60,352. Males had a median income of $54,241 versus $25,234 for females. The per capita income for the city was $20,336. About 5.9% of families and 7.0% of the population were below the poverty line, including 10.7% of those under age 18 and none of those age 65 or over.

Infrastructure

Education
Colstrip Public Schools educates students from kindergarten through 12th grade. The highest level of education offered in Colstrip is the Colstrip High School. They are known as the Colts/Fillies. The nearest college is Chief Dull Knife College in Lame Deer. Many Cheyenne students from the reservation attend school at the high school, making up about one third of the students.

The Bicentennial Library operates in Colstrip.

Recreation

Colstrip offers a wide variety of recreational and sports activities. Boating and fishing is available on Castle Rock Lake, an artificial reservoir used by the Colstrip power plants. Fishing enthusiasts can find bluegill, bass, walleye and pike. A 3.2 mile walking/biking trail runs around the lake, and a picnic area and beach is available to swimmers. A year-round recreational facility is available free to residents at Rye Park through Colstrip Parks and Recreation District. CPRD, formerly CARPA, offers sports programs for children and adults alike including golf, soccer, basketball, baseball, fitness and health classes.  CPRD facilities include a weight room and cardio room, and two different gymnasiums. CPRD also maintains the bike paths around the city.

Notable people
 Wally McRae — Cowboy poet who earned the 1990 National Endowment for the Arts' National Heritage Award
 Tuff Harris — safety for the Pittsburgh Steelers, moved from Lodge Grass to play football at Colstrip High School as a sophomore

See also

 List of municipalities in Montana

References

Further reading
 David R. Wilson, “You Grow Where You’re Planted: Community Building in Colstrip, Montana” (PhD Dissertation: Brigham Young University, 2000)

 Joel Vetsch, The Virtual Tour of Colstrip, Montana (Colstrip, MT: Bright Idea Web Design, 2005)
 Carol Ward, Michael Cope, Kayci Muirbrook, Nick Andre, Jake Wixom, and David Wilson, “Colstrip Community Survey: Report I: Community Life, Perspectives, and Outlook for the Future” (Provo, UT: Charles Redd Center for Western Studies, 2019)
 William B. Evans and Robert L. Peterson. “Decision at Colstrip.” Pacific Northwest Quarterly Vol. 61, No. 3 (Fall 1970): 129-36.

External links

 City website
 Colstrip United Collection, Montana Memory Project. https://mtmemory.org/digital/collection/p16013coll150/search/searchterm/Colstrip%20United%20Collection/field/digita/mode/exact/conn/and
 

Populated places established in 1924
Company towns in Montana
Northern Pacific Railway
Cities in Rosebud County, Montana
Mining communities in Montana
Cities in Montana